Perambur is a neighbourhood located in the northern region of Chennai, Tamil Nadu, India.

Etymology
In Tamil, pirambu (பிரம்பு) means bamboo, and ur (ஊர்) means city or place. Before British rule, this place was widely regarded as a place that was a bamboo forest, around the Huzur Gardens area, which currently houses the Simpsons Pvt. Ltd. This area was annexed to Chennai in 1742 CE.

Location 
Perambur is located at an altitude of 10 m above mean sea level.

Streets 
Some of the major connecting roads and streets include: Paper Mills Road, Perambur High Road, Madhavaram High Road, Paddy Field Road, Patel Road, School Road, Bharathi Road, Siruvallur High Road, Raghava Street, B.B. Road, and Bunder Garden Street. Apart from these, Perambur also has a road named after Robert Baden-Powell, the founder of the Scout Movement. The road is well known as BP Road.

Transportation

Road transport 
This neighbourhood is well connected to all parts of Chennai by bus services operated by the Metropolitan Transport Corporation. Its proximity to the Chennai Central railway station makes it an important transport hub.

Railway transport 

Perambur has a notable railway town in the Indian Railways landscape as it is home to the Vande Bharat Express, produced at the Integral Coach Factory located here and also the presence of Chennai Rail Museum, in addition to the railway station serving to decongest the Chennai Central station by serving as a major alighting point for long distance trains passing through or terminating in the city from the North-Western end. The Perambur railway station is considered as the oldest railway station in the city after Royapuram.

Perambur is one of the earliest British settlements in Chennai, mainly because of the railway establishments during the 1850s. Perambur is noted for having the largest presence of Anglo-Indians in Chennai (and arguably in South India) because of the erstwhile British settlements in and around Perambur, during the construction and operation of the Integral Coach Factory (ICF). The ICF is located only in Perambur, with an ancillary unit in Kolkata in India. ICF, Chennai is also home to Vande Bharat Express also known as Train 18, the indigenously produced trainset of the Indian Railways.  Perambur also houses the Chennai Rail Museum which has a large collection of vintage coaches, engines and a railway coach themed restaurant. Perambur has two (Carriage Works and Loco Works) of the three railway workshops serving Indian Railways' Southern Railway Zone.

Perambur is served by three railway stations: Perambur railway station, Perambur Carriage Works railway station and Perambur Loco Works railway station. Perambur railway station is one of the major railway hubs in Chennai because of ICF and because express and superfast trains stop there. It is the fifth largest station in Chennai in passenger volume after Chennai Central, Chennai Egmore railway station, Tambaram and Mambalam.

Education

Schools 
Smt Chandabai Pagariya Jain Matriculation Higher Secondary School, Kaligi Ranganathan Montford Matriculation Higher Secondary School, St. Mary's Matriculation Girls higher secondary school, St. Mary's Matriculation Boys higher secondary school, Chennai Corporation Higher Secondary School, Dharmamurthi Rao Bahadur Calavala Cunnan Chetty's (DRBCCC) Higher Secondary School, Veera Savarkar Netaji Matriculation School, Don Bosco Higher Secondary School, Don Bosco Nursery and Primary School which with Savio Primary School is on the premises of the Shrine of Our Lady of Lourdes, Gnanodhaya Vidhyalayam, Lourdes Girls Higher Secondary School, Railway Mixed Higher Secondary School, Begum Latheefunnisa Islamic Nursery and Primary School, Sacred Heart's Nursery and Primary School, St. Joseph's Anglo-Indian Higher Secondary School, St. John's Nursery and Primary School, St. Thomas Primary School, SKNS PMC Vivekananda Vidyalaya, V.O.C. Vidiyalaya Matriculation Higher Secondary School, Periyar matriculation higher secondary school, Sri Bala Vidyalaya (CBSE), KRM Public School (CBSE), etc.

Healthcare 
Medical facilities such as Sen Hospital, Cure Advanced Dental Care, Southern Railway Headquarters Hospital, Jupiter Surgical Specialty Centre, Abhijay Hospital, A. C. Aruldoss Hospital, Srinivas Priya Hospital, Aishwarya Hospital (child care), Iyappa Diabetes Hospital, Vigneshwara Eye Hospital, Apple Hospital are available here.

Entertainment 
Perambur has a wide range of entertainment venues such as cinemas and parks. Perambur has the first shopping mall of the north Chennai: Spectrum Mall.

It has a five-screen multiplex named S2 Cinemas which is controlled by theatre franchise SPI Cinemas. Sri Brinda Theatre is popular among cinema lovers. Perambur has many other cinema theatres such as Ganga Cinemas in Kolathur ,which is just 5 km away.

Parks 
Perambur Flyover Park, Mahatma Gandhi Park and Venus Park are few important parks. Perambur has Chennai's first disco waterpark — Murasoli Maran Park — which is crowded on weekends and special occasions.

Stadium 
Perambur Railway Stadium is frequented for athletic events, annual sports meets and training sessions.

Facility

Murasoli Maran Flyover 
The rail over bridge connecting Perambur railway station with that Perambur Carriage Works had been a source of transportation discomfort because of its narrow pass and low road which used to flood during rain. In 1999 the Dravida Munnetra Kazhagam (DMK) government decided to build a flyover along with nine others.

The work reached a halt when one of the columns started sinking. This led to the cost of the proposed flyover shoot from Rs.21 crore (210 million) to Rs 34 crore (340 million). Furthermore, DMK lost in the consecutive 2001 elections (although its ally Communist Party of India (Marxist) (CPI-M) retained Perambur constituency) which led to a further stalemate for the project. The flyovers became the centre of political debacle for the next five years. After DMK came back to power in 2006, it started working on the project once again, but this time with an even more shooting up of the proposed cost.

The flyover serves the people living in Perambur, Kolathur, T.V.K. Nagar, Periyar Nagar, Kumaran Nagar, Ayanavaram, Vinayagapuram, Madhavaram, Mathur and Kodungaiyur.

The flyover was constructed with different plan and was inaugurated by the then Chief Minister Mr. Karunanidhi and the then Deputy Chief Minister Mr. Stalin on 28 March 2010. The flyover serves to reduce the traffic congestion in and around North Chennai. It is 1.3 km in length and 13 meters high from the ground, and is one of the tallest bridges in Chennai after Kathipara, Guindy. The bridge consist of three levels, road below, rail in the middle and road again at the top.

Religion 
There are Hindu and Buddhist temples , mosques and churches in the area.

Gallery

Neighbouring areas

Notes

References

External links 

Neighbourhoods in Chennai
Cities and towns in Chennai district